Ernst Madland (21 February 1927 – 16 November 1984) was a Norwegian gymnast. He competed in eight events at the 1952 Summer Olympics.

References

1927 births
1984 deaths
Norwegian male artistic gymnasts
Olympic gymnasts of Norway
Gymnasts at the 1952 Summer Olympics
Sportspeople from Stavanger
20th-century Norwegian people